Bernardine of Lippe (1563–1628) was a Countess of Lippe by birth and by marriage Countess of Leiningen-Leiningen.

Background 
She was a daughter of Count Bernhard VIII of Lippe (1527–1563) from his marriage with Catherine (1524–1583), the daughter of Count Philip III of Waldeck-Eisenberg.

Marriage and issue 
In 1587, she married Count Louis of Leiningen-Westerburg (1557–1622).  She had nine children:
 George Philip (1579–1589).
 Amalie (1581–1582).
 Ursula Maria (1583–1638), married in 1606 to Maximilian Marschall of Pappenheim.
 Simon (1584–1585).
 Amalie (1586–1604).
 John Casimir (1587–1635), Count of Leiningen-Leiningen, married in 1617 to Martha of Hohenlohe-Weikersheim (1575–1638).
 Anastasia (1583–1638), married in 1624 to Count Konrad Wilhelm of Tübingen.
 Philip II (1591–1668), Count of Leiningen-Rixingen, married in 1618 to Agathe Catherine Schenk of Limpurg (1595–1664).
 Louis Emich (1591–1668), Count of Leiningen-Oberbronn, married in 1624 to Esther of Eberstein (1603–1682).

German countesses
House of Lippe
Nobility of Lippe
Leiningen family
1563 births
1628 deaths
Daughters of monarchs